The Danish Landrace (Danish language:) is a breed of sheep endemic to Jutland in Denmark. The breed, which had a population of approximately 370 in 2000, is not a true landrace, but descend from Heath sheep and Merino, with early specimen interbreeding in the 19th century with Leicester and Oxford Down sheep. While up to 10% of males have horns, the breed is mostly polled.

Description

The Danish Landrace sheep is a rather small and light breed. They are a very hardy breed and are thought to have survived because they do well in the harsh climate and nutrient poor lands of the dune heaths of western Jutland. No other sheep breed can compete with them in this particular habitat, but they require large areas to roam and are a wild breed by nature.

With males averaging  and females , Danish Landrace are a medium-sized, double-coated long-tailed sheep that produce  of fleece. As meat is not abundant on Danish Landrace sheep, their plenty of wool is used in manufacturing wool blankets and carpets. The face and tail of the sheep are spotted brown, but they are predominantly white.

Danish Landrace sheep can be experienced at The Funen Village open-air museum.

Conservation status 
In 1986, the Danish Landrace sheep population was down to almost 50 animals, with only three male breeders registered. Danish conservation efforts has now stabilized the breed, with an estimated stock of about 1,100 animals and 30 registered male breeders in 28 herds (2004 numbers). The breed is still largely endangered though.

See also
 List of sheep breeds

References

Sources 
 Dansk Landfår/Sheep/Denmark European Farm Animal Biodiversity Information System (EFABIS)

Sheep breeds
Sheep breeds originating in Denmark